Tenancingo may refer to:

 Tenancingo, State of Mexico, Mexico
 Tenancingo, Tlaxcala, Mexico
 Tenancingo, Cuscatlán, El Salvador